Erythrophysa septentrionalis is a species of plant in the family Sapindaceae. It is endemic to Ethiopia.

References

Flora of Ethiopia
septentrionalis
Near threatened plants
Endemic flora of Ethiopia
Taxonomy articles created by Polbot